Harry A. Burke High School is a secondary school located in Omaha, Nebraska, United States.  The principal is Darren Rasmussen. The school's mascot is the Bulldog.

Each year in May, the Nebraska State Track Meet is held at the school. Its stadium was renovated in 2008.

Name
Burke High School was dedicated to Harry A. Burke in November 1967. Burke, who was Omaha Public Schools superintendent from 1946 to 1962, actively prevented black educators from having positions of authority during his tenure. Among Burke's racist statements was "I would never want black people in a position of power, where white children would be educated." A 2019 op-ed in school newspaper The Burke Beat and a June 2020 petition both called for the school to change its name. Alternative namesakes were suggested, including Lucinda Gamble, Omaha Public Schools' first African American teacher.

Extracurricular activities

Academic Decathlon
Burke has participated in the Academic Decathlon competition for 14 years, and has been the Nebraska state champion seven times. Their chief rivals are Creighton Preparatory School and Pius X High School. Burke holds the record for the highest overall score by a Nebraska team (48,337), set in 2008. In 2009, the Burke Academic Decathlon team placed second in Division I and third overall at the national competition.

Athletics
Burke athletic teams have won 39 state championships.

Notable alumni
 George Andrews, professional football player for the old Los Angeles Rams and 19th overall pick in the 1979 NFL Draft
 Craig Anton, supporting character on Phil of the Future
Joshua Becker, minimalist writer
 Barney Cotton, offensive line coach for the Nebraska Cornhuskers football team
 Jason Dourisseau, professional basketball player
 Mike Freeman, jazz musician
 Alex Henery, professional football player
 Rich King, professional basketball player 
 Rod Kush, professional football player and founder of Rod Kush Furniture
 Jackson Withrow, professional tennis player

References

External links 
 Burke website
 Omaha Burke High School alumni website

Omaha Public Schools
High schools in Omaha, Nebraska
Educational institutions established in 1965
Public high schools in Nebraska
Magnet schools in Nebraska
1965 establishments in Nebraska